Alphonso David Jordan (born November 1, 1987, in El Paso, Texas) is an American track and field athlete specializing in the triple jump. He represented his country at the 2016 World Indoor Championships finishing twelfth.

His personal bests in the event are 16.89 metres outdoors (+0.9 m/s, Eugene 2015) and 16.57 metres indoors (Albuquerque 2011).

Competition record

References

1987 births
Living people
Sportspeople from El Paso, Texas
Track and field athletes from Texas
American male triple jumpers
African-American male track and field athletes
Pan American Games track and field athletes for the United States
Athletes (track and field) at the 2015 Pan American Games
Georgia Tech Yellow Jackets men's track and field athletes
Savannah College of Art and Design alumni
21st-century African-American sportspeople
20th-century African-American people